Razz (proper spelling: RAZZ) is an indie rock band from the municipality of Twist (Lower Saxony, Germany). The band members are Niklas Keiser (singer), Steffen Pott (drums), Christian Knippen (guitar) and Lukas Bruns (bass).

History 

The band was founded in May 2011. They played their first concert with self-written songs at the Abifestival 2012 in Lingen (Ems).

In 2013, they performed as the opening act on the Tour of Alex Clare. They also performed at various festivals in 2013 and 2014, such as the Hurricane Festival, the Open Flair Festival, Lollapalooza in Berlin, the Deichbrand Festival or the Reeperbahn Festival. In 2014, they received the newcomer award by Radio Fritz.

The first single "Black Feathers" was released in July 2015. The second single "Youth And Enjoyment" and their debut album With Your Hands We'll Conquer were released in October 2015. The album was listed in the German album charts for one week and reached number 69 Ihre erste eigenständige Konzerttournee fand 2015/2016 an mehreren Orten in Deutschland statt. Their first independent concert tour took place in 2015/2016 at several places all around Germany.

During the process of their first album release, they appeared on the 14 December 2015 live on TV in the show Circus HalliGalli as "the band from the phone box"  as well as in an episode of the German TV series Gute Zeiten, schlechte Zeiten. In early 2016, Razz supported the Chemnitz rock band Kraftklub at two of their concerts.

In 2017, they were the opening act at Jimmy Eat World's German concerts  and played at the Rock am Ring and Rock im Park festivals for the first time ..

The second studio album Nocturnal was released in September 2017, produced by Stephen Street. The album stayed in the German charts for one week, and reached place 55.

After the album's release, they played concerts in Germany, Austria and Switzerland as headliners and as support band for Mando Diao.

In 2019, Razz supported the English indie rock band Bloc Party at two German concerts.

The EP Might Delete Later was released on 18 June 2021; the six tracks included the pre-released singles "1969 - Conrad, Like You" and "Game".

Style 
Razz play an experimental mix of alternative indie and rock. They combine garage rock, a little rock 'n' roll and blues rock with modern beats. Razz are often compared to the Kings of Leon.

Discography

Studio albums

EPs

Singles

External links 

 Offizielle Website
 Discogs

References 

German indie rock groups
Musical groups established in 2011
Musicians from Lower Saxony